is a railway station on the Ōu Main Line in the city of Yokote, Akita Prefecture,  Japan, operated by JR East.

Lines
Jūmonji Station is served by the Ōu Main Line, and is located 217.8  km from the terminus of the line at Fukushima Station.

Station layout
The station consists of one side platform and one island platform, connected by a footbridge. The station is staffed.

Platforms

History
Jūmonji Station opened on September 14, 1905 as a station on the Japanese Government Railways (JGR), serving the village of Jūmonji, Akita. The JGR became the Japan National Railways (JNR) after World War II. Freight operations were discontinued from 1984. The station was absorbed into the JR East network upon the privatization of the JNR on April 1, 1987.

Passenger statistics
In fiscal 2018, the station was used by an average of 416 passengers daily (boarding passengers only).

Surrounding area
 Former Jūmonji  town hall

See also
List of railway stations in Japan

References

External links

 JR East Station information 

Railway stations in Japan opened in 1905
Railway stations in Akita Prefecture
Ōu Main Line
Yokote, Akita